Glasgow Bridgeton was a parliamentary constituency in the city of Glasgow.  From 1885 to 1974, it returned one Member of Parliament (MP) to the House of Commons of the Parliament of the United Kingdom, elected by the first-past-the-post voting system.

For many years it was represented by James Maxton, the leader of the Independent Labour Party whose policies were to the left of the Labour Party.

Boundaries 

The Redistribution of Seats Act 1885 provided that the constituency was to consist of the first and fourth Municipal Wards.

The constituency was described in the Glasgow Parliamentary Divisions Act 1896 as being:

In the Representation of the People Act 1918 it was described as:

The Representation of the People Act 1948 provided that the constituency was to consist of the Calton and Dalmarnock wards of the City of Glasgow. The Parliamentary Constituencies (Scotland) (Glasgow Bridgeton, Glasgow Provan and Glasgow Shettleston) Order, 1955 added to this the portion of the Mile-End ward that had previously been part of the Glasgow Camlachie constituency.

The Parliamentary Constituencies (Scotland) Order 1970 provided that the constituency was to consist of:

Members of Parliament

Election results

Elections in the 1880s

Russell resigned, causing a by-election.

Elections in the 1890s

Trevelyan was appointed Secretary of State for Scotland, requiring a by-election.

Elections in the 1900s

Elections in the 1910s

General Election 1914–15:

Another General Election was required to take place before the end of 1915. The political parties had been making preparations for an election to take place and by July 1914, the following candidates had been selected; 
Liberal: MacCallum Scott
Unionist: William Hutchison

Unionist candidate William Hutchison withdrew when Coalition Government endorsed the Liberal candidate

Elections in the 1920s

Elections in the 1930s

Elections in the 1940s

Elections in the 1950s

Elections in the 1960s

Elections in the 1970s

Notes

References 

Historic parliamentary constituencies in Scotland (Westminster)
Constituencies of the Parliament of the United Kingdom established in 1885
Constituencies of the Parliament of the United Kingdom disestablished in 1974
Politics of Glasgow
Bridgeton–Calton–Dalmarnock